The Vanishing Outpost is a 1951 American Western film produced and directed by Ron Ormond starring Lash LaRue and Al "Fuzzy" St. John.  It was the tenth of LaRue's films for Ormond's Western Adventures Productions Inc. The film was the fourth to be released by Howco, Ron Ormond's new film company composed of Ormond and drive-in movie owners Joy N. Houck and J. Francis White, and Ormond's second film as director.  The  screenplay is credited to Ormond's wife June Carr and Maurice Tombragel. The film is composed mostly of footage from the previous Ormond LaRue Westerns Son of Billy the Kid (1949), Mark of the Lash (1948),  Outlaw Country (1949) and  Son of a Bad Man (1949).  No outpost, vanishing or otherwise is seen in the film.  The story appeared in Fawcett Comics' Motion Picture Comics #111 (1952).

Plot
En route to more adventures, Lash and Fuzzy stop off in a saloon where Lash knocks down and straightens out an obnoxious drunk named Mack.  Mack has been terrorising the barflies including Walker, an undercover Pinkerton Detective.  Recognising Lash and Fuzzy as Marshals, Walker seeks their help in replacing his murdered partner to bring an outlaw gang to justice.

Cast
 Lash La Rue as Marshal Lash LaRue
 Al St. John as Fuzzy Q. Jones
 Riley Hill as Walker
 Sharon Hall as Nancy Walker
 Archie R. Twitchell as Mack
 Clarke Stevens as Denton
 Sue Hussey as Sue
 Cliff Taylor as 1st Bartender 
 Bud Osborne as Rufe

References

External links

1951 films
American Western (genre) films
1951 Western (genre) films
American black-and-white films
1950s English-language films
1950s American films